Levie, a commune in the Corse-du-Sud department of France on the island of Corsica

Levie may also refer to:

People
Given name
Levie Jacob Fles or Louis Fles, (1872–1940), Dutch businessman, activist and author
Levie Vorst (1903–1987),  rabbi of Rotterdam from 1946 to 1959 and chief rabbi from 1959 to 1971

Surname
Aaron Levie, American entrepreneur
Alexander Levie (1865–1955), Scottish veterinary surgeon
Craig Levie (born 1959), Canadian ice hockey player
Howard S. Levie (1907–2009), American legal expert on the law of war and the key draftsman of the Korean Armistice Agreement
Michel Levie (1851–1939), Belgian politician

See also
State v. Levie, a decision of United States Hennepin County District Court
Levi (disambiguation)
Levy (disambiguation)